Michael Yale Scudder Jr. (born January 9, 1971) is a United States circuit judge of the United States Court of Appeals for the Seventh Circuit.

Education and legal career 
In 1989, Scudder graduated from  Bishop Dwenger High School in Fort Wayne, Indiana.  Scudder received his Bachelor of Business Administration from Saint Joseph's College as co-valedictorian, and his Juris Doctor in 1998 magna cum laude from the Northwestern University Pritzker School of Law, where he was inducted into the Order of the Coif. Scudder worked as an auditor for Ernst and Young before attending law school and is a Certified Public Accountant.

Following law school, Scudder served as a law clerk for Judge Paul V. Niemeyer of the United States Court of Appeals for the Fourth Circuit from 1998 to 1999, and then for Justice Anthony Kennedy of the Supreme Court of the United States from 1999 to 2000. Following his clerkships, he first worked as an attorney for two years at Jones Day in Cleveland, Ohio. He then served as: Assistant United States Attorney for the Southern District of New York (2002–2006); counsel to the National Security team of the U.S. Department of Justice (2006); associate counsel to President George W. Bush in the White House Counsel's office (2007); and as the general counsel of the National Security Council (2007–2009).

He served as a partner of Skadden, Arps, Slate, Meagher & Flom in Chicago, Illinois from 2009 to 2018. Additionally, he has taught at the Pritzker Law School and at the University of Chicago Law School.

Federal judicial service 

On February 12, 2018, President Donald Trump announced his intent to nominate Scudder to an undetermined seat on the United States Court of Appeals for the Seventh Circuit. On February 15, 2018, his nomination was sent to the Senate. President Trump nominated Scudder to the seat vacated by Judge Richard Posner, who retired on September 2, 2017. On March 21, 2018, a hearing on his nomination was held before the Senate Judiciary Committee. On April 19, 2018, his nomination was reported out of committee by a 21–0 vote. On May 14, 2018, his nomination was confirmed by a 90–0 vote. Scudder received his commission on May 21, 2018.

Personal life 

On July 3, 1993, Scudder married Sarah Rose Schoenle in Allen County, Indiana. Scudder serves as vice chairman of the Board of Advisors of the Catholic Charities, Archdiocese of Chicago.

See also 
 List of law clerks of the Supreme Court of the United States (Seat 1)

References

External links 
 
 
 Biography at Skadden, Arps, Slate, Meagher & Flom

1971 births
Living people
20th-century American lawyers
21st-century American lawyers
21st-century American judges
American accountants
Assistant United States Attorneys
George W. Bush administration personnel
Illinois lawyers
Illinois Republicans
Jones Day people
Judges of the United States Court of Appeals for the Seventh Circuit
Law clerks of the Supreme Court of the United States
Northwestern University Pritzker School of Law alumni
Northwestern University Pritzker School of Law faculty
People from Fort Wayne, Indiana
Saint Joseph's College (Indiana) alumni
Skadden, Arps, Slate, Meagher & Flom people
United States court of appeals judges appointed by Donald Trump
United States Department of Justice lawyers
University of Chicago Law School faculty